Ruellia noctiflora, the nightflowering wild petunia, is a herbaceous perennial found along the Gulf coast. Both its specific and common names derive from its habit of nocturnal flowering. In spite of the common name it is in a different family from the garden petunia.

It is considered endangered in Florida.

Description
When ripe it splits in half longitudinally, discharging the seed. Unusually for the genus no cleistogamous flowers are formed.

Habitat
R. noctiflora is generally a wetlands plant and prefers longleaf pine savanna. The principal threats to it (besides outright habitat destruction) are suppression of the fires needed to clear out the understory, and competition from invasive species, particularly cogon grass.

Hybridization studies with other North American Ruellia species suggest a close relationship with Ruellia caroliniensis, which grows across the United States southeast.

References

noctiflora
Flora of the Southeastern United States